Jeff Gutheim (born September 16, 1971) is an American screenwriter, who specializes in the comedy genre.

Gutheim has penned scripts for Warner Bros., Paramount Pictures, New Line Cinema and WWE Studios, including rewrites of Full of It (2007) and Knucklehead (2010). His latest project is the upcoming six-part BBC One series Queen of Oz (2023), starring Catherine Tate as a disgraced member of a fictional British Royal Family sent to rule Australia.

Early career 

Gutheim started down the path to becoming a screenwriter quite accidentally. He and his friend since the third grade, Ari Michael Steinbeck, decided to write a screenplay for fun. After finishing their first screenplay, a dark comedy called Don't Call Unless the Maid Dies (originally titled Sand Traps and Eskimo Pies), a friend of theirs submitted it to his literary agent, Gayla Nethercott. She found their fresh voice inspiring and immediately signed them to her agency, Broder Kurland Webb Agency, which has since merged into ICM Partners.

They quickly found out that Hollywood agreed with their agent's opinion and they were hired to write Crash Test Dummy for New Line Cinema. Soon after that, they sold Day Traitor (2000) to Warner Bros. The film was later renamed Cash Money and was supposed to tell the story of a nerdy teenager who decides to participate in a little day trading and strikes it rich. Jerry Weintraub was attached to the film as a producer. The following year they sold the script for Crackerjack (2001), a comedy about a card shark and a security guy who team up to pull off one of the biggest scams in Las Vegas, to Intermedia Films. All three projects were eventually scrapped.

In 2002, Gutheim and Steinbeck decided to end their writing partnership. Steinbeck has since started a hedge fund, with Gutheim continuing as a screenwriter.

Continuing career 

In 2005, Gutheim was again hired by New Line Cinema to write the last draft of Full of It (2007), a teen comedy starring Ryan Pinkston, Kate Mara, Craig Kilborn and Carmen Electra. In September of the following year he was hired by Paramount Pictures to write the screenplay, Stitch 'n Bitch, based on the best-selling series of books written by Debbie Stoller.

In June 2007, Gutheim wrote and went on tour to shoot a series of webisodes centered on the band Fall Out Boy.

In 2009, Gutheim was hired by WWE Studios to write the final draft of Knucklehead (2010), a comedy film starring wrestler Big Show, Mark Feuerstein, Melora Hardin, Dennis Farina and Will Patton.

In August 2022, the BBC announced that Gutheim had co-written the upcoming six-part comedy series Queen of Oz (2023), starring his partner Catherine Tate as the scandalous Princess Georgiana, a disgraced member of a fictional British Royal Family sent to rule Australia. Filming is due to begin at the end of 2022.

Personal life
Gutheim has three children from his British-born ex-wife Tracey.

In early 2019, it was announced that Gutheim had become engaged to English comedian, actress and writer Catherine Tate.

Filmography 

 Full of It (2007)
 Knucklehead (2010)
 Queen of Oz (2023)

References

External links 

 
 

1971 births
Living people
American male screenwriters
American screenwriters
21st-century American screenwriters